Michael Zanier (born August 22, 1962) is a Canadian-born Italian former professional ice hockey goaltender who played extensively in Europe and in North American minor leagues.

Born in Trail, British Columbia, Zanier's junior career was spent with five different teams in the WHL. He was never drafted, but signed with the Edmonton Oilers where he saw some NHL playing time. Zanier dressed for games 4 and 5 of the 1984 Stanley Cup Finals, due to Grant Fuhr being injured. He did not appear in either game. Although the Oilers won the Cup, Zanier's name was not engraved on it because he had not officially played in any NHL games. However, he did receive a Stanley Cup ring. Zanier did play three games for Edmonton during the next season, but that was the extent of his NHL career. Zanier went on to play many seasons in Europe, and represented Italy at the 1992 Winter Olympics.

Career statistics

Regular season and playoffs

International

External links 
 

1962 births
Living people
Abbotsford Flyers players
Asiago Hockey 1935 players
Billings Bighorns players
Bolzano HC players
Calgary Wranglers (WHL) players
Canadian expatriate ice hockey players in England
Canadian expatriate ice hockey players in Germany
Canadian expatriate ice hockey players in Italy
Canadian ice hockey goaltenders
Dallas Freeze players
EC Hannover Turtles players
Edmonton Oilers players
Ice hockey people from British Columbia
Ice hockey players at the 1992 Winter Olympics
Indianapolis Checkers players
Italian ice hockey goaltenders
Medicine Hat Tigers players
Moncton Alpines (AHL) players
New Westminster Bruins players
Nottingham Panthers players
Nova Scotia Oilers players
Olympic ice hockey players of Italy
Serie A (ice hockey) players
Spokane Flyers players
Sportspeople from Trail, British Columbia
Undrafted National Hockey League players
Western International Hockey League players